Seawind may refer to:
Seawind Ocean Technology, an offshore wind energy technology company
Seawind (band), a jazz fusion band
SeaWind Line, a subsidiary of a Finnish passenger shipping company
Seawind 300C, a small amphibious aircraft